The flag of Louisiana consists of a rectangular field of blue with the arms of Louisiana, the pelican vulning herself, in white in the center, with a ribbon beneath, also in white, containing in blue the state motto: "Union Justice Confidence." The flag was officially adopted July 1, 1912, and is often referred to as the Pelican flag.

History
As early as 1812 the brown pelican appeared on the Louisiana state seal, various militia company colors, and uniform buttons. On July 1, 1912, the centennial of statehood, the State Legislature adopted the flag design depicting a pelican vulning herself. However, beyond stating that the pelican be rendered "in white," the 1912 law did not specify details about the design of the pelican, its number of chicks, or other details. This led to the bird's appearance varying. During the 19th century it was traditional on the state flag and seal for the pelican in her piety to have three drops of blood on her chest. In later years, however, the tradition (on both the state flag and seal) was haphazardly followed, which was noticed by an eighth-grader at Vandebilt Catholic High School in Houma, who brought this to the attention of his state legislator.

On May 25, 2006, a law was enacted requiring the flag to include "an appropriate display of three droops of blood" on the pelican's breast; however, it wasn't until November 22, 2010, that a formal redesign of the flag with standardized imagery was formally introduced. Baton Rouge artist Curtis Vann Jr., who was hired to design a standardized pelican for the updated flag, used a more realistic depiction of a brown pelican for his design, although rendered in white as required by law, but he also incorporated the brown pelican's yellow–brown crown. The design also specified an azure field and removed "and" from the banner beneath the pelican's nest.

First flag
On February 11, 1861, the state adopted a flag with a pale yellow star in a red canton and thirteen blue, white, and red stripes. The first flag was used until the end of the Civil War.

Symbolism
In medieval lore, pelicans were believed to be attentive to the needs of their chicks to the point of drawing their own blood to feed their chicks when no other food was available. This image of the pelican in her piety came to symbolize the Passion of Jesus and the Eucharist. William C. C. Claiborne, the first governor of the Orleans Territory, selected a pelican for the territory's first seal and it was a common state symbol prior to being formally adopted in 1912 as part of the state flag. The shape of the mother pelican's head and outspread wings covering the three chicks nestled below her also form a stylized fleur-de-lis, another emblem popular in Louisiana.

Pledge of allegiance
The Louisiana Pledge of Allegiance, adopted in 1981, is as follows: 
"I pledge allegiance to the flag of the state of Louisiana and to the motto for which it stands: A state, under God, united in purpose and ideals, confident that justice shall prevail for all of those abiding here."

See also

 List of flags by design
 List of Louisiana state symbols
 List of U.S. state, district, and territorial insignia

References

External links

 
 

 
Lou
Lou
1912 establishments in Louisiana
Lou